The following lists events that happened in 1961 in Libya.

Incumbents
Monarch: Idris 
Prime Minister: Muhammad Osman Said

Births
 Abdulbari Al Arusi

Deaths
 Ahmed Rafiq Almhadoui

 
Years of the 20th century in Libya
Libya
Libya
1960s in Libya